Sophia Grojsman is a Belarus-born American perfumer. Grojsman is a Vice President of International Flavors and Fragrances, a perfume and scent company.

Early years and education
Sophia Grojsman was born in Belarus, a former Soviet state. She received a Bachelor of Science degree in analytical chemistry.

In 1965, Grojsman immigrated to the United States and soon later began to work at International Flavors and Fragrances as a lab technician.

Honours
In 1994, Sophia Grojsman received the Cosmetic Executive Women's Achiever Award for her lifetime contributions to perfumery. She received the Living Legend Award from the American Society of Perfumers in 1996, In 1999 Grojsman was honored by the Cosmetic Executive Women for her lifetime achievements in the fragrance industry. In 2016, Grojsman received the Perfumer of Year, Lifetime Achievement Award by the Fragrance Foundation.

Creations
Among the best-selling fragrances that Grojsman has created:
 Bill Blass Nude (1990)
 Boucheron Jaipur (1994)
 Bvlgari Bvlgari Pour Femme (1994)
 Calvin Klein Eternity (1988)
 Calvin Klein Eternity Purple Orchid (2002)
 Celine Magic (1996)
 Christian Lacroix Christian Lacroix (1999)
 Coty, Inc. Ex'cla-ma'tion (1988)
 Elizabeth Taylor Diamonds and Rubies (1993)
 Estée Lauder Beautiful (1985)
 Estée Lauder Spellbound (1992)
 Estée Lauder White Linen (1978)
 Frederic Malle Outrageous! (2007)
 Gloria Vanderbilt Vanderbilt (1982)
 IVS Elite Group Désir Coulant (2012)
 HRH Princess Elizabeth E (2002)
 HRH Princess Elizabeth Jelisaveta (2002)
 Karl Lagerfeld Sun Moon Stars (1994)
 Kenzo Kashaya (1994)
 Lalique Lalique (1992)
 Lancôme Trésor (1990)
 Lancôme Trésor Sparkling (2007)
 Laura Biagiotti Sotto Voce (1996)
 Oscar De La Renta Volupté (1992)
 Paloma Picasso Tentations (1996)
 Perry Ellis 360° (1992)
 Prescriptives Calyx (1987)
 Michel Germain Séxūal (1994)
 S-Perfume 100% Love (2003)
 Yves Rocher Neblina (2000)
 Yves Saint Laurent Paris (1983)
 Yves Saint Laurent Paris Premieres Roses (2003)
 Yves Saint Laurent Parisienne (2009)
 Yves Saint Laurent Yvresse (1993)

References

Perfumers
Living people
Year of birth missing (living people)